Gervais II (c. 1030 – c. 1095) was the lord of Château-du-Loir. In 1067, Gervais II succeeded his uncle, Gervais de Château-du-Loir. Gervais II had a daughter, named Matilda, who married Elias I, Count of Maine in 1090.

References

11th-century French people
1030 births
1090s deaths
Year of birth uncertain
Year of death uncertain